Sjefke Janssen (28 October 1919 – 3 December 2014) was a Dutch professional road bicycle racer. He is most known for his bronze medal in the Elite race of the 1947 UCI Road World Championships. Janssen was a professional cyclist from 1946 through 1954. After retiring, he became a cycling team-manager and owned a bicycle shop in Elsloo.

Personal life
Janssen was born and died in Elsloo. At the time of his death, Janssen was the oldest living Dutch Tour de France racer. He was the father of Dutch Olympic team dressage coach Sjef Janssen.

Major results

1944
  Independent Road Race Champion
1946 - Bloc Centauro
1947 - Magneet
 Dutch National Road Race Championship
  World Road Race Championship
 32nd, Tour de France
1948 - Magneet, Garin-Wolber
 36th, Tour de France
1949 - Magneet
 Dutch National Road Race Championship
 5th, Tour de Luxembourg
1950 - RIH, Terrot, Magneet
 1st, Stage 2, Saarland Rundfahrt
 3rd, National Road Race Championship
1951 - Ceylon, Prisma
1952 - Express, Venz
1953 - Locomotief
 8th, Züri-Metzgete
1954 - Locomotief

References

External links

Official Tour de France results for Sjefke Janssen

1919 births
2014 deaths
People from Stein, Limburg
Dutch male cyclists
Cyclists from Limburg (Netherlands)